Vashisht is a village in Kullu district, Himachal Pradesh, India. It is a popular tourist place.

Vashisht is a village located 3 km  from Manali across the River Beas. This village is famous for its sulphurous hot water springs and sanctified by three main temples dedicated to Lord Vashisht, Lord Shiva and Lord Rama built just next to the springs. The water from this spring is believed to have great healing powers, which can cure many skin diseases, infections and pains. There are separate baths for both men and women. This place has a refreshing atmosphere that allows one to indulge in a holy bath while seeking blessing from the presiding deity of the village.

The road to the village from Manali is bordered by shops and restaurants selling food, clothing, and tourist goods. Beyond the hot springs are local houses and a school. Above the main part of the village are many local houses and apple orchards.

References 

Villages in Kullu district